"La Gata Golosa" is a Colombian song written in 1912 by Fulgencio García. It was originally titled "Soacha" but was retitled by Garcia in honor of a famous Bogota restaurant.

In its list of the 50 best Colombian songs of all time, El Tiempo, Colombia's most widely circulated newspaper, ranked the version of the song recorded in the 1960s by Oriol Rangel at No. 30. Viva Music Colombia rated the song No. 28 on its list of the 100 most important Colombian songs of all time.

References

Colombian songs